Women Fully Clothed is a Canadian live sketch comedy troupe, with a cast of four women, touring throughout the world.

Cast
Kathy Greenwood (Whose Line Is It Anyway?, This Hour Has 22 Minutes)
Robin Duke (Saturday Night Live, SCTV)
Jayne Eastwood (My Big Fat Greek Wedding, This Is Wonderland)
Teresa Pavlinek (History Bites, The Jane Show)

Overview
The show was the brainchild of Robin Duke in 2003, and was originally commissioned for a Second City fundraiser.

Most shows last for 90 minutes (although they can be as short as 20, or as long as 120). Sketches focus on issues that the everyday woman faces with a "comedic" twist.

Disclaimers are made by each cast member during the show to emphasize that the show is not about male-bashing. Men are encouraged to come to the show as well, although a majority of their audiences is women.

Women Fully Clothed was featured in the 2006 Just for Laughs comedy festival in Montreal, Quebec. They were also nominated for Best Sketch Troupe at the 6th Annual Canadian Comedy Awards in 2005. Eugene Levy calls them "the five funniest women in Canada."

The show originally featured five women, but Debra McGrath (Getting Along Famously) left the group for unknown reasons in the first half of 2009.

The show is directed by John Hemphill.

References

External links
Women Fully Clothed website (copy archived January 9, 2019)

Canadian comedy troupes
Comedy tours